This article contains information about the literary events and publications of 1958.

Events
January 7 – Tennessee Williams' one-act plays Suddenly, Last Summer and Something Unspoken are premièred off-Broadway.
January 13 – In One, Inc. v. Olesen, the Supreme Court of the United States affirms that homosexual writing is not as such obscene.
March 29 – The stage première of Max Frisch's dark comedy Biedermann und die Brandstifter (known in English as The Fire Raisers) takes place at the Schauspielhaus Zürich.
April 28 – The première of Harold Pinter's play The Birthday Party is held at the Cambridge Arts Theatre in England, with Richard Pearson playing the lead as Stanley.
May 19 – The London début of the production of Pinter's The Birthday Party, starring Richard Pearson, takes place at the Lyric Opera House (Hammersmith). It closes after a week, but its reputation is saved by a review by Harold Hobson in The Sunday Times on May 25.
May 27 – The 19-year-old Shelagh Delaney's A Taste of Honey is staged by Joan Littlewood's Theatre Workshop at the Theatre Royal Stratford East in London. Littlewood has received the script with a covering letter stating "A fortnight ago I didn't know the theatre existed".
Spring/Summer – London publishers Faber introduce their paper-covered editions, including T. S. Eliot's Collected Poems, William Golding's Lord of the Flies, J. W. Dunne's An Experiment with Time and the first of several science fiction anthologies edited by Edmund Crispin, all with covers designed by Berthold Wolpe based on the Albertus typeface.
August 18 – Vladimir Nabokov's controversial novel Lolita is published in the United States.
c. September – Herbert Marcuse begins teaching at Brandeis University, Massachusetts.
October 14 – Brendan Behan's play The Hostage is first performed in an English version by Joan Littlewood's Theatre Workshop at the Theatre Royal Stratford East in London. Also this year, Behan's autobiographical Borstal Boy is published in London, and on November 12 it is banned in Ireland by the Censorship of Publications Board.
October 23 – Announcement of the award of the Nobel Prize in Literature to Boris Pasternak leads to denunciation of him in the Soviet Union and threats to expel him.
October 28 – Samuel Beckett's monologue Krapp's Last Tape is first performed by Patrick Magee at the Royal Court Theatre, London. Also this year, Beckett's novel The Unnamable is first published in English.
November – Truman Capote's novella Breakfast at Tiffany's is published in this month's Esquire magazine (having been rejected for July's Harper's Bazaar). It appears soon afterwards as the title story in a collection published by Random House in New York City.
unknown dates
The first volume of Shelby Foote's military history The Civil War: A Narrative is published in the United States.
Jack Kerouac writes and narrates the "beat" film, Pull My Daisy (released 1959).
Ken Kesey is awarded a Woodrow Wilson National Fellowship to enrol in the creative writing program at Stanford University.
Mervyn Peake begins to develop Parkinson's disease.

New books

Fiction
Chinua Achebe – Things Fall Apart
Kingsley Amis – I Like It Here
Jorge Amado – Gabriela, Cravo e Canela (Gabriela, Clove and Cinnamon)
Louis Aragon – La Semaine Sainte
Chingiz Aytmatov – Jamila
Layla Balabakki - I Live
H. E. Bates – The Darling Buds of May
Samuel Beckett – The Unnamable
 Margot Bennett – Someone from the Past
Thomas Berger – Crazy in Berlin
John Bingham – Murder Plan Six
James Blish – A Case of Conscience
Joseph Payne Brennan – Nine Horrors and a Dream
Algis Budrys
Man of Earth
Who?
Dino Buzzati – Sessanta racconti
Philip Callow – Common People
Truman Capote – Breakfast at Tiffany's
John Dickson Carr – The Dead Man's Knock
Rosario Castellanos – Balún-Canán
Henry Cecil – Sober as a Judge
Raymond Chandler – Playback
Agatha Christie – Ordeal by Innocence
Richard Condon – The Oldest Confession
A. J. Cronin
The Innkeeper's Wife
The Northern Light
 Cecil Day-Lewis – A Penknife in My Heart
L. Sprague de Camp – An Elephant for Aristotle
Patrick Dennis – Around the World with Auntie Mame
August Derleth
The Mask of Cthulhu
The Return of Solar Pons
Marguerite Duras – Moderato Cantabile
Lawrence Durrell
Balthazar
Mountolive
Nawal El Saadawi – Memoirs of a Woman Doctor
Ian Fleming – Dr. No
C. S. Forester – Hornblower in the West Indies
Carlos Fuentes – Where the Air Is Clear (first published in Spanish as )
Peter George – Red Alert
Rumer Godden – The Greengage Summer
Julien Gracq – Un Balcon en forêt (A Balcony in the Forest)
Graham Greene – Our Man in Havana
Cyril Hare – He Should Have Died Hereafter
Marlen Haushofer – We Murder Stella (Wir töten Stella)
 A. P. Herbert – Made for Man
Georgette Heyer – Venetia
Thomas Hinde – Happy as Larry
Harold L. Humes – The Underground City
Emyr Humphreys – A Toy Epic
Hammond Innes – The Land God Gave to Cain
 Michael Innes – The Long Farewell
Rona Jaffe – The Best of Everything
Anna Kavan – A Bright Green Field and Other Stories
Jack Kerouac – The Dharma Bums and The Subterraneans
Frances Parkinson Keyes – Victorine
 Audrey Erskine Lindop– I Thank a Fool
Giuseppe Tomasi di Lampedusa – The Leopard (Il Gattopardo, published posthumously)
Manuel Lopes – O Galo Que Cantou na Baía
E. C. R. Lorac – Murder on a Monument
John D. MacDonald – The Executioners
Ross Macdonald – The Doomsters
Richard Matheson – A Stir of Echoes
Gladys Mitchell – Spotted Hemlock
Alberto Moravia – Two Women (La ciociara)
M. T. Vasudevan Nair – Naalukettu
R. K. Narayan – The Guide
Kenzaburō Ōe (大江 健三郎) – Nip the Buds, Shoot the Kids (芽むしり仔撃ち, Memushiri ko-uchi)
Maurice Procter – Man in Ambush
Barbara Pym – A Glass of Blessings
Jean Raspail – Welcome, Honourable Visitors
Ernest Raymond – The Quiet Shore
Mary Renault – The King Must Die
Anya Seton – The Winthrop Woman
Alan Sillitoe – Saturday Night and Sunday Morning
Terry Southern (as Maxwell Kenton) – Candy
Rex Stout
And Four to Go
Champagne for One
Yves Thériault – Agaguk
Zaim Topčić – Lump of Sun
Robert Traver – Anatomy of a Murder
Leon Uris – Exodus
Jack Vance – The Languages of Pao
Rex Warner – Young Caesar
Jerome Weidman – The Enemy Camp
Angus Wilson – The Middle Age of Mrs Eliot
S. Yizhar – Days of Ziklag (ימי צקלג, Yemei Tziklag)

Children and young people
Raymond Abrashkin and Jay Williams – Danny Dunn and the Homework Machine
Rev. W. Awdry – Duck and the Diesel Engine (thirteenth in The Railway Series of 42 books by him and his son Christopher Awdry)
Enid Blyton – Five Get into a Fix
Michael Bond – A Bear Called Paddington (introducing Paddington Bear)
Bruce Carter – The Kidnapping of Kensington
Anne de Vries – The New Day (De Nieuwe Dag, last in the Journey Through the Night – Reis door de nacht series)
Rumer Godden – The Greengage Summer
E. W. Hildick – Jim Starling (first of a series of seven)
A. A. Milne, Latin by Alexander Lenard – Winnie ille Pu
Elyne Mitchell – The Silver Brumby (first in the Silver Brumby series)
Philippa Pearce – Tom's Midnight Garden
Keith Robertson – Henry Reed Inc. (first in the Henry Reed series)
Dr. Seuss – Yertle the Turtle and Other Stories
Elizabeth George Speare – The Witch of Blackbird Pond
William O. Steele – The Perilous Road
Catherine Storr – Marianne Dreams
Rosemary Sutcliff – Warrior Scarlet
Nigel Tranter – Spaniard's Isle
Henry Treece – The Children's Crusade
T. H. White – The Once and Future King

Drama
Samuel Beckett – Krapp's Last Tape
Brendan Behan – The Hostage
Bertolt Brecht – The Resistible Rise of Arturo Ui (Der aufhaltsame Aufstieg des Arturo Ui, written 1941, first performed)
Clemence Dane – Eighty in the Shade
Refik Erduran – Bir Kilo Namus (One Kilo Honesty)
Max Frisch – The Fire Raisers (Biedermann und die Brandstifter, first stage adaptation)
Jean Genet – The Blacks: A Clown Show (Les Nègres, clownerie, first published)
Kenneth Horne – Wolf's Clothing
N.C. Hunter – A Touch of the Sun
Ann Jellicoe – The Sport of My Mad Mother
Ronald Millar – The Big Tickle
Sławomir Mrożek – The Police (Policja)
Heiner Müller and Inge Müller
Die Korrektur (The Correction)
Der Lohndrücker (The Scab, first performed)
Mohan Rakesh – Ashadh Ka Ek Din (आषाढ़ का एक दिन, One Day in Ashadh)
Barry Reckord – Flesh to a Tiger
Elmer Rice – Cue for Passion
Peter Shaffer – Five Finger Exercise
N. F. Simpson – The Hole
Wole Soyinka – The Swamp Dwellers
Derek Walcott – Drums and Colours
 Arthur Watkyn – Not in the Book
Arnold Wesker – Chicken Soup with Barley (first performed)
Tennessee Williams – Suddenly, Last Summer

Poetry
John Betjeman – Collected Poems
Ko Un – Hyondae Munhak
Octavio Paz – La estación violenta
Eli Siegel – Hot Afternoons Have Been in Montana: Poems
Clark Ashton Smith – Spells and Philtres

Non-fiction
Henri Alleg – La Question
Hannah Arendt – The Human Condition
Brendan Behan – Borstal Boy
Shelby Foote – The Civil War: A Narrative – Vol 1: Fort Sumter to Perryville
John Kenneth Galbraith – The Affluent Society
J. Edgar Hoover – Masters of Deceit
Aldous Huxley – Brave New World Revisited
Claude Lévi-Strauss – Structural Anthropology
Philip O'Connor – Memoirs of a Public Baby
Eric Partridge – Origins: A Short Etymological Dictionary of Modern English
John Maynard Smith – The Theory of Evolution
John Steinbeck – Once There Was A War
Raymond Williams – Culture and Society 1780–1950
Michael Young – The Rise of the Meritocracy

Births
February 0 – Walid al-Kubaisi, Norwegian-Iraqi author, journalist, translator, film director and government scholar (died 2018)
March 14 – James Robertson, Scottish novelist 
April 6 – Graeme Base, English-born Australian children's author and illustrator
April 15 – Benjamin Zephaniah, English dub poet
May 7 – Robert Antoni, West Indian novelist
May 8 – Roddy Doyle, Irish novelist
May 14 – Anna Höglund, Swedish writer and illustrator
May 18 – Jonathan Maberry, American writer
May 21 – Taku Ashibe (芦辺 拓), Japanese mystery novelist
May 22 – Wayne Johnston, Canadian novelist
May 26 – Moinul Ahsan Saber, Bangladeshi writer and editor
June 10 – James F. Conant, American philosopher
June 14 – Todur Zanet, Gagauz poet and translator
June 16 – Isobelle Carmody, Australian science fiction, fantasy and children's writer
June 22 – Bruce Campbell, American actor, producer, writer and director
July 3 – Charlie Higson, English speculative fiction writer
July 5 – Veronica Guerin, Irish journalist (murdered 1996)
August 15 – Victor Shenderovich, Russian writer
September 5  –  Pierre Leroux, Canadian novelist, journalist and screenwriter
October 30 – Flora Fraser, English biographer
November 11 – Kathy Lette, Australian novelist, playwright and activist
November 24 – Gregory Doran, English theater director
December 10 - Cornelia Funke, German children's author
unknown dates
Lionel Fogarty, indigenous Australian poet
Margaret Smith, American poet
Nega Mezlekia, Ethiopian writer

Deaths
February 4 – Henry Kuttner, American science fiction author (born 1915)
February 6 – Charles Langbridge Morgan, English novelist and dramatist (born 1894)
March 15 – Michael Joseph, English publisher (born 1897)
March 17 – Margiad Evans, Anglo-Welsh writer and poet (born 1909)
March 21 – Cyril M. Kornbluth, American science fiction writer (born 1923)
March 24 – Seumas O'Sullivan, Irish poet (born 1879)
April 7 – Elliot Paul, American writer (born 1892)
April 8 – Ethel Turner, English-born Australian novelist and children's author (born 1873)
May 5 – James Branch Cabell, American fantasy author (born 1879)
June 4 – Eleanor Hallowell Abbott, American fiction writer and poet (born 1872)
June 10  – Angelina Weld Grimké, African-American playwright and poet (born 1880)
June 28 – Alfred Noyes, English poet (born 1880)
August 6 – Geoffrey Willans, English novelist and comic writer (born 1911)
August 29 – Marjorie Flack, American author and illustrator (born 1897)
September 11 – Robert W. Service, English-born Canadian comic poet (born 1874)
October 7 – Louise Hammond Willis Snead, American writer, artist, and composer (born 1868)
October 24 – G. E. Moore, English philosopher (born 1873)
October 30 – Rose Macaulay, English novelist (born 1881)
November 9 – Dorothy Canfield Fisher, American activist and novelist (born 1879)
December 8
Nicolae Petrescu-Comnen, Romanian social scientist, historian and poet (born 1881)
Peig Sayers (Máiréad Ó Gaoithín), Irish seanchaí (traditional storyteller, born 1873)
December 20 – J. C. Squire, English writer and critic (born 1884)

Awards
Carnegie Medal for children's literature: Philippa Pearce, Tom's Midnight Garden
Hugo Award for Best Novel: Fritz Leiber, The Big Time
James Tait Black Memorial Prize for fiction: Angus Wilson, The Middle Age of Mrs. Eliot
James Tait Black Memorial Prize for biography: Joyce Hemlow, The History of Fanny Burney
Miles Franklin Award: Randolph Stow, To the Islands
Newbery Medal for children's literature: Harold Keith, Rifles for Watie
Newdigate prize: Jon Stallworthy
Nobel Prize in literature: Boris Pasternak
Premio Nadal: J. Vidal Cadellans, No era de los nuestros
Pulitzer Prize for Drama: Ketti Frings, Look Homeward, Angel
Pulitzer Prize for Fiction: James Agee, A Death In The Family
Pulitzer Prize for Poetry: Robert Penn Warren, Promises: Poems 1954-1956

References

 
Years of the 20th century in literature